Iain Cameron may refer to:

Iain Cameron, character in Kiss Me Kate (TV series)

See also
Ian Cameron (disambiguation)